The 1969–70 Iowa Hawkeyes men's basketball team represented the University of Iowa in intercollegiate basketball during the 1969–70 season. The team was led by Ralph Miller and played their home games at the Iowa Field House. The Hawkeyes finished the season 20–5 and won the Big Ten title with a 14–0 conference record. To date, this is the last outright regular season conference title for the Iowa men's basketball team.

After opening the season 3–4, the Hawkeyes won 17 of their final 18 games. Led by a nucleus of players known as the "Six Pack" – John Johnson, Chad Calabria, Fred Brown, Glenn "Stick" Vidnovic, Dick Jensen, and Ben McGilmer – the team averaged 98.7 points per game including a conference-record 102.9 points per game in Big Ten games. They opened NCAA tournament play with a 104–103 loss to eventual National runner-up Jacksonville. The Hawkeyes regrouped to defeat Notre Dame 121–106 in the Mideast Regional Third-Place game.

Roster

Schedule/results

|-
!colspan=9| Regular season
|-

|-
!colspan=9| NCAA tournament

Rankings

Player stats

Awards and honors
John Johnson – Third-Team All-American, AP and UPI; school-records of 27.9 ppg and 49 points in a single game vs. Northwestern on Feb. 24, 1970

Team players in the 1970 NBA Draft

References

Iowa Hawkeyes men's basketball seasons
Iowa
Iowa
Hawkeyes
Hawkeyes